"Final Warning" is the second single released by the American recording artist Skylar Grey for her second studio album Don't Look Down. The song was written by Alexander Grant and Grey, and produced by Grant.

Background
While Skylar Grey was living in a cabin in Oregon, she said that she was coming into a new version of herself. Grey said she wrote "Final Warning" in that cabin the same week she had written the chorus to "Love the Way You Lie." The song is also about the same relationship as "Love the Way You Lie". "Final Warning" took two hours to write, according to Grey.

Critical reception
Sam Lansky from Idolator described the song as "a skittering midtempo ballad that’s not playful or ironic — it’s just dark" and compared its lyrics to Grey's biggest hit as a songwriter, "Love the Way You Lie".

Track listings
Digital download
"Final Warning" - 3:41

Remix Versions
"Final Warning" (Faustix & Imanos Remix) - 3:22
"Final Warning" (MisterMike Remix featuring Thurz) - 5:10
"Final Warning" (featuring Corey Pieper & Nathan Allan) - 3:29

Music video
On April 17, lyric video for the song was released on Grey's Vevo account. On May 13, Grey released the official musical video, which "tells the story of a mistress whose lover attempts to put her to rest for good, so he can live happily ever after with his pretty blond wife. However, Grey, who plays the other woman, resurfaces, and confronts her would-be murderer at home, in front of his family during his birthday party". The music video has over 6 million views.

Charts

References

2013 songs
2013 singles
Songs written by Skylar Grey
Interscope Records singles
Skylar Grey songs
Song recordings produced by Alex da Kid
Songs written by Alex da Kid